Greatest Hits 2 is a greatest hits album by American rock band Journey. The album was released on November 1, 2011 by Columbia Records.

The compilation album is the band's second greatest hits package. It was released 23 years after the first greatest hits package in 1988. The album includes the remaining radio hits that were left off the first greatest hits package and fan favorites. This includes "Stone in Love", "Feeling That Way", "Anytime", "Just the Same Way", "Still They Ride", "Suzanne", "Walks Like a Lady", "The Party's Over" and "After the Fall".

Background 
Greatest Hits 2 was released on CD, digital download and in a gatefold double-vinyl edition. The songs were re-mastered to vinyl by Robert Hadley and former lead singer of Journey, Steve Perry. Perry said of the mastering: "I truly forgot how sonically exciting and just plain better these Journey tracks sound back where they originally lived...on vinyl. The stereo separation, the center imaging and the sonic depth of the tracks themselves is more true to what we all loved about these original final mixes. All the instruments and voices, to me personally, sound so damn good that all I want to do is reach for the volume and turn it up!".

The album was supposed to include "The Eyes of a Woman" but by request by lead guitarist Neal Schon, it was replaced by "Little Girl". Neal Schon's father, jazz musician Matthew Schon worked with the band on "Little Girl".

Track listing

Personnel 
The following people contributed to Greatest Hits:

Steve Perry - Compilation Producer

Infinity
 Neal Schon - Lead & Rhythm Guitar, Background Vocals
 Gregg Rolie - Keyboards, Background & Lead Vocals on Feeling That Way & Anytime
 Ross Valory - Bass, Background Vocals
 Aynsley Dunbar - Drums, Percussion
 Steve Perry - Lead Vocals
 Roy Thomas Baker - Producer

Evolution, Departure & Dream, After Dream
 Neal Schon - Lead & Rhythm Guitars, Background Vocals
 Gregg Rolie - Keyboards, Harmonica, Background & Lead Vocals on Just the Same Way
 Ross Valory - Bass, Background Vocals
 Steve Perry - Lead Vocals
 Steve Smith - Drums, Percussion
 Roy Thomas Baker - Producer on Evolution
 Kevin Elson & Journey - Producers on Departure & Dream, After Dream

Captured
 Neal Schon - Lead & Rhythm Guitar, Background Vocals
 Ross Valory - Bass, Background Vocals
 Steve Perry - Lead Vocals
 Steve Smith - Drums, Percussion
 Geoff Workman - Keyboards, Background Vocals 
 Kevin Elson - Producer

Escape, Frontiers, Trial by Fire & Live in Houston 1981: The Escape Tour
 Neal Schon - Lead Guitar, Background Vocals 
 Ross Valory - Bass, Background Vocals
 Steve Perry - Lead Vocals, Producer on Live in Houston 1981: The Escape Tour
 Steve Smith - Drums, Percussion
 Jonathan Cain - Keyboards, Rhythm Guitar, Background Vocals
 Randy Jackson - Bass, Background Vocals on After the Fall
 Mike Stone & Kevin Elson - Producers on Escape & Frontiers
 Kevin Shirley - Producer on Trial by Fire

Raised on Radio
 Neal Schon - Lead Guitar, Background Vocals
 Steve Perry - Lead Vocals, Producer
 Jonathan Cain - Keyboards, Rhythm Guitar, Background Vocals
 Randy Jackson - Bass, Background Vocals 
 Larrie Londin - Drums, Percussion
 Steve Minkins - Percussion

Greatest Hits I & II

Greatest Hits I & II is a repackaging of both of Journey’s Greatest Hits albums. Originally released in 2011, it was reissued in Japan in both 2013 and 2017 with different cover art.

Track listing

References 

2011 greatest hits albums
Journey (band) compilation albums
Albums produced by Kevin Elson
Albums produced by Roy Thomas Baker
Albums produced by Mike Stone (record producer)
Columbia Records compilation albums
Legacy Recordings compilation albums